Marinomonas aquimarina is a bacterium from the genus of Marinomonas which has been isolated from oysters and seawater.

References

External links
Type strain of Marinomonas aquimarina at BacDive -  the Bacterial Diversity Metadatabase

Oceanospirillales
Bacteria described in 2005